Ecological Economics. The Transdisciplinary Journal of the International Society for Ecological Economics is a peer-reviewed academic journal published by Elsevier on behalf of the International Society for Ecological Economics. It covers research on ecological economics. The journal was established in 1989 by founding editor-in-chief Robert Costanza. The current editors-in-chief are Richard B. Howarth (Dartmouth College) and Stefan Baumgärtner (University of Freiburg). The journal is concerned with "extending and integrating the understanding of the interfaces and interplay between 'nature's household' (ecosystems) and 'humanity's household' (the economy)". The journal is transdisciplinary in spirit and emphasizes work that draws on and integrates insights from natural sciences, social sciences and the humanities. Related to economics, the journal includes contributions drawing on both neoclassical and a broad variety of heterodox approaches, which has given rise to lively discussions among the membership over the years.

References 
1.	 "Ecological Economics: Aims and Scope", Elsevier. Accessed: May 3, 2021.

2.	 Røpke, I. (2005) Trends in the development of ecological economics from the late 1980s to the early 2000s. Ecological Economics 55: 262-290.

3.	 Howarth, R.B. (2008). Editorial. Ecological Economics 64: 469.

4.	 Spash, C. L. (2012) New foundations for ecological economics. Ecological Economics 77: 36-47.

5.	 Spash, C. L. (2013) The Shallow or the Deep Ecological Economics Movement? Ecological Economics 93: 351-362.

External links 
 

Ecological economics
Economics journals
Environmental social science journals
Elsevier academic journals
Publications established in 1989
Monthly journals
English-language journals